CEH or Ceh may refer to:

 Certified Ethical Hacker, a professional certification
 Centre for Ecology and Hydrology
 Historical Clarification Commission, Spanish: Comisión para el Esclarecimiento Histórico
 Coleshill Parkway railway station (England), National Rail station code "CEH"
 Clyde Edwards-Helaire (born 1999), American football player
 Cystic endometrial hyperplasia, a condition in animals that can cause pyometra
 Čeh, a Slovene surname
 Czech Republic, UNDP country code

See also